Haasil may refer to:

Haasil (film), a 2003 Indian film directed by Tigmanshu Dhulia
Haasil (Pakistani TV series), a 2016 Pakistani drama television series directed by Abdullah Badini
Haasil (Indian TV series), a 2017 Indian thriller romantic drama series

See also
Haasil Ghaat, a Pakistan novel